The Seneca Pumped Storage Generating Station is a hydroelectric power plant using pumped storage of water to generate electric power.  It is located near Warren, Pennsylvania in Warren County.

Seneca Station is colocated with the Kinzua Dam, near Warren, Pennsylvania.  The dam was built by the United States Army Corps of Engineers to regulate the Allegheny River as part of a larger flood control project, and, as a secondary role, to generate hydroelectric power.  It created the Allegheny Reservoir, a lake that stretches  upriver, nearly to Salamanca, New York within the Allegany Reservation of the Seneca Nation of New York. The station generates on average approximately 570,000 megawatt hours of electric energy  every year. It has generated hundreds of millions of dollars in profits for its operators since opening in 1970.

The power plant, rated at 451 MW, was built by the Pennsylvania Electric Company and Cleveland Electric Illuminating Company.  It began commercial operation in 1970.  Through business mergers and acquisitions, the plant became owned by FirstEnergy, an operator of several base load (nuclear and coal-fired) power plants. Seneca was among 11 hydroelectric power stations that FirstEnergy agreed in 2013 to sell to LS Power of New York City.

Pumped storage plants function similarly to a storage battery; they absorb excess power generated by such plants in off-peak hours, such as nighttime, using it to pump water into a reservoir.  Later, when demand exceeds the base load, the flow of water from the reservoir generates additional electrical power to meet peak load demands. Like all storage schemes the facility is a net consumer of electricity due to losses in the cycle.

References

Energy infrastructure completed in 1970
Hydroelectric power plants in Pennsylvania
Buildings and structures in Warren County, Pennsylvania
Allegheny River
FirstEnergy
Pumped-storage hydroelectric power stations in the United States